Burcote is a village near Bridgnorth in Shropshire, England.

External links

Villages in Shropshire